Calchas (Kalkhas) is an Argive mantis, or "seer," dated to the Age of Legend, which is an aspect of Greek mythology. Calchas appears in the opening scenes of the Iliad, which is believed to have been based on a war conducted by the Achaeans against the powerful city of Troy in the Late Bronze Age.

Calchas, a seer in the service of the army before Troy, is portrayed as a skilled augur, Greek ionópolos ('bird-savant'): "as an augur, Calchas had no rival in the camp."

He received knowledge of the past, present, and future from the god, Apollo. He had other mantic skills as well: interpreting the entrails of the enemy during the tide of battle. His mantosune, as it is called in the Iliad, is the hereditary occupation of his family, which accounts for the most credible etymology of his name: “the dark one” in the sense of “ponderer,” based on the resemblance of pondering to melancholy, or being “blue.” Calchas has a long literary history after Homer. His appearance in the Iliad is no sort of “first” except for the chronological sequence of literature. In the legendary time of the Iliad, seers and divination are already long-standing.

Description 
Calchas was described by the chronicler Malalas in his account of the Chronography as "short, white, all grey, including the beard, hairy, a very fine seer and omen-reader".

Family 
Calchas was the son of Polymele and Thestor; grandson of the seer Idmon; and brother of Leucippe, Theonoe, and Theoclymenus

Career
It was Calchas who prophesied that in order to gain a favourable wind to deploy the Greek ships mustered in Aulis on their way to Troy, Agamemnon would need to sacrifice his daughter, Iphigeneia, to appease Artemis, whom Agamemnon had offended. The episode was related at length in the lost Cypria, of the Epic Cycle. He also states that Troy will be sacked on the tenth year of the war.

In Sophocles' Ajax, Calchas delivers a prophecy to Teucer suggesting that the protagonist will die if he leaves his tent before the day is out.

Iliad 
In the Iliad, Calchas is cast as the apostle of divine truth. His most powerful skeptic is Agamemnon himself. Before the events of the Iliad, at the beginning of the expedition, Agamemnon had to sacrifice his daughter Iphigenia to receive favorable sailing winds. At the beginning of the Iliad Calchas delivers another blow to him.

In open assembly, Calchas prophesied that the captive Chryseis, a spoil of war awarded to Agamemnon, must be returned to her father Chryses in order to propitiate Apollo into lifting the plague he sent as punishment for Agamemnon's disrespect of Chryses, Apollo's priest. Agamemnon exploded in anger and called the prophet a "visionary of hell" (Fitzgerald translation) and accused Calchas of rendering unfair prophecies. Fearing Agamemnon, Calchas had already secured a champion in Achilles, who spoke against Agamemnon in heated terms in assembly. Agamemnon grudgingly accepted the edict of Apollo (supported by the Assembly) that he give up his prize, but, as an insult to Achilles, threatens to take Achilles’ own female prize as recompense. There follows "the wrath of Achilles," part righteous anger, part galling resentment over the unjustified overreaching of Agamemnon, part love for his war bride. This dispute is a central focus of the epic.

Later in the story, Poseidon assumes the form of Calchas in order to rouse and empower the Greek forces while Zeus is not observing the battle.

Posthomerica 
Calchas also plays a role in Quintus of Smyrna's Posthomerica. Calchas said that if they were brief, they could convince Achilles to fight. It is he rather than Helenus (as suggested in Sophocles' Philoctetes) that predicts that Troy will only fall once the Argives  are able to recruit Philoctetes. It is by his advice that they halt the battle, even though Neoptolemus is slaughtering the Trojans. He also tells the Argives that the city is more easily taken by strategy than by force. He endorses Odysseus' suggestion that the Trojan Horse will effectively infiltrate the Trojans. He also foresees that Aeneas will survive the battle and found the city, and tells the Argives that they will not kill him. He did not join the Argives when they boarded the ships, as he foresaw the impending doom of the Kapherean Rocks.

Death
Calchas died of shame at Colophon in Asia Minor shortly after the Trojan War (as told in the Cyclic Nostoi and Melampodia): the prophet Mopsus beat him in a contest of soothsaying, although Strabo placed an oracle of Calchas on Monte Gargano in Magna Graecia.

It is also said that Calchas died of laughter when he thought another seer had incorrectly predicted his death. This seer had foretold Calchas would never drink from the wine produced from vines he had planted himself; Calchas made the wine, but holding the cup he died of laughter, before he could inform them they had drunk it the previous night.

In medieval and later versions of the myth, Calchas is portrayed as a Trojan defector and the father of Chryseis, now called Cressida.

Calchas is a character in William Shakespeare's play Troilus and Cressida.

References

Achaean Leaders
Mythological Greek seers
Metamorphoses characters
Argive characters in Greek mythology